Sydney Frederick Galvayne (2 April 1848 - 10 June 1913) was the nom de plume of Frederick Henry Attride, also known as Ralph Frederick Osborne, a well-known Victorian-era horse tamer, and author. He was a renowned expert in the health and well-being of horses and authored four books on the topic. He is best known for estimating the age of a horse by a groove on its teeth. The groove is widely known as the Galvayne's Groove, and is located on the lateral surface of the upper third incisor.

Birth and family 

Frederick Henry Attride was born on 2 April 1848, at Park Road in Peckham. His parents were Henry and Sarah Attride, and Frederick was the second child of ten children. Henry was a Clerk at the Bank of England.

Early years 

Frederick went to school at the Upper School in Peckham, founded by Dr. John Yeats, for four years and the Manilla College, another Independent Boys School, established by Mr. John Douglas for three years. His schooling was clearly focused on a career in the City of London, like his father and grandfather before him. Frederick was a keen sportsman, both in cricket and athletics. There was a great cricket oval at Peckham Rye near his home and school. He played at least one game at The Oval. His father Henry was a committee member of the Hanover Cricket Club for whom Frederick played. At the time Cricket clubs also participated in athletics where he was a runner in the 440 yards handicap.

The Bank of England 

Frederick followed in his father’s footsteps and became a Clerk in the Bank of England at the age of 18 as an unattached clerk in the Accountant Departments Bank Note Office. However, three years later he was asked to tender his resignation because he made a false statement to the bank about loans that he had taken out.

Horse taming 

Frederick left the United Kingdom, in 1875, leaving his wife Emily and two sons, under the assumed name of Ralph Frederick Osborneand went to Australia. He went to Sydney and ran a business called ‘F. OSBORNE and CO., Horse Bazaar’ in the Haymarket area.  He later moved the business to Melbourne where he married and fathered two boys. It was here that he met Professor Hamilton Sample, an American horse tamer and author who taught Frederick the art of horse taming. Frederick was a good student and used Professor Sample’s teaching to become a horse tamer. He reinvented himself as Professor Sydney Frederick Galvayne, the Australian Horse Tamer. He left Melbourne and returned to the United Kingdom as a new and successful horse tamer. 

He was known as a scientific and humane horse tamer using a humane system of training unbroken or vicious horses that utilized the horse’s strength against itself. He held over 300 classes teaching these methods and in 1887 appeared before Queen Victoria. He is also known for "Galvayning", a horse-taming method he invented in which the horses head was tied to its tail causing it to spin around until it quieted down.  On the outbreak of the Second Boer War in 1899, Frederick, using the name Sydney Galvayne, volunteered for active service. He left for South Africa to serve in the Army Remount Service as a farrier and was appointed an honorary lieutenant and horse breaker. He was awarded the Queen's South Africa Medal with four clasps (Cape Colony, Orange Free State, Transvaal and Natal).

Author  

During his lifetime Frederick wrote four books on horses under the name of Sydney Galvayne. First was, Horse dentition: showing how to tell exactly the age of a horse up to thirty years published in 1885. This book is still used in horse dentistry today. The second was, The horse: its taming, training, and general management: with anecdotes, &c., relating to horses and horsemen published in 1888. Third, War horses present & future: or, Remount life in South Africa in 1902 and finally The XXth century book on the horse in 1905. This book also contained a Practical Treatise on Training Ponies and Playing Polo, by his son Fred. Galvayne, born Frederick Henry George Attride. He also wrote articles for newspapers.

Controversy 

The method of aging a horse called the Galvayne's Groove which he claimed as his invention was actually promoted by Professor Hamilton Samplein his book, The Horse and Dog: Not as They are But as They Should Be in 1882, where he demonstrated ‘how to tell a horses age up to 21 years’. It can be drawn from this that Frederick was not the originator of this theory; however, he made it his own, and the groove on the horses’ tooth is still called the Galvayne Groove today.

Marriage and children 
Frederick was married four times and had eight children.

Death  
He died on 10 June 1913 in Ovington, Hampshire, England.

See also  

Army Remount Service 
Horse teeth
The Horseman's Word

Notes

References  

Australian Town and Country Journal, A new market for horses, Sydney, 2 July 1892.

Australasian Pastoralists Review, Inventions & Works of Sydney Galvayne, Scientific and Humane Horse Tamer and Educator.

Australasian, Turf Gossip, Melbourne, 7 May 1887.

Bank of England Archives, London. 

Bedfordshire Mercury, Court Reports, 15 Jan 1904.

Bolton, D.K., Croot, P.E.C. & Hicks, M.A. Willesden: Economic history, A History of the County of Middlesex: Volume 7, Acton, Chiswick, Ealing and Brentford, West Twyford, Willesden, London, 1982, pp. 220-228.

Evening News, Sample the horse Tamer, 19 June 1885, Page 5.

Galvayne, S. Horse dentition: showing how to tell exactly the age of a horse up to thirty years. Thomas Murray & Son, Glasgow, 1885.

Galvayne, S. The horse: its taming, training, and general management: with anecdotes, &c., relating to horses and horsemen. Thomas Murray & Son, Glasgow,1888.

Galvayne, S. War horses present & future: or, Remount life in South Africa. 1902.

Galvayne, S. The XXth century book on the horse. Robert Atkinson Limited, London, 1905

Hayes, M.H., Among men and horses, T. Fisher Unwin, London, 1894.

Leader, Literature, Melbourne, 23 August 1902.

London Evening Standard, The law courts, London, 30 June 1893.

London Gazette, Bankruptcy, 10 December 1875, page 8284.

Lynch, J. Teeth Are the Reason To ‘Never Look a Gift Horse in the Mouth’, Mackinac Town Crier, 9 February 2008

Nottingham Evening Post, Libel on a horse trainer, 30 June 1893.

Ramey, D., Aging the Horse (or not), 10 January 2016.

Sample, H. The horse and dog, 1882.

South Wales Echo, An interview with Mr. Galvayne, 18 August 1890.

South Australian Register, Horse Breaking Extraordinary, 4 January 1886.
Sporting Times, Northern cracks, 9 August 1902.

Sporting Life, Horse Taming by Professor Leon, 19 April 1890.

Supreme Court Notes, Morgan V’s Osborne, 15 December 1884.

Swindon Advertiser and North Wilts Chronicle, Under the Patronage of Her Majesty the Queen, Sydney Galvayne, The King of Horse Tamers, 16 June 1888.

Thanet Advertiser, Alleged False Pretenses, 21 March 1914.

The Herald, Osborne v’s Osborne, Melbourne, 1 November 1884.

The Scotsman, Galvayne and his system, 13 December 1912.

The Telegraph, The courts, Melbourne, 13 October 1883.

Western Mail, It was an Australian who discovered a useful aid to judging the age of horses, Perth, 3 Oct 1946.
Yarmouth Independent, The Theater Royal, 2 August 1890.

Zabawski, E. Galvayne’s Grove - Why you should not look a gift horse in the mouth? Tribology & Lubrication Technology, April 20.

1848 births
1913 deaths
British horse trainers
People of the Second Boer War
Warhorses